The name Andrasta can signify:

 Andrasta (goddess), in Celtic mythology
 Andrasta class submarine, a French submarine design
 Andrasta (yacht), the prototype Iceni 39 offshore racing yacht